Gopi Bhalla is an Indian actor. Some of his notable works in television include F.I.R. and Hum Aapke Hain In Laws. He have also played in more than 30 Punjabi films.

Filmography

Films

Television

References

External links
 

Living people
Indian male film actors
Indian male television actors
Indian male comedians
1968 births